Aproaerema lerauti is a moth of the family Gelechiidae. It is found in Spain and Portugal.

References

Moths described in 2001
Aproaerema
Moths of Europe